Justice Peters may refer to:

Ellen Ash Peters, associate justice of the Connecticut Supreme Court
Emil C. Peters, associate justice of the Supreme Court of Hawaii
John A. Peters (1822–1904), chief justice of the Maine Supreme Judicial Court
John Thompson Peters, associate justice of the Connecticut Supreme Court
Raymond E. Peters, associate justice of the Supreme Court of California
Thomas Minott Peters, associate justice and chief justice of the Alabama Supreme Court

See also
Judge Peters (disambiguation)